Acetoxycycloheximide is an organic chemical compound. It can be considered as the acetylated analogue of cycloheximide. It is a potent protein synthesis inhibitor in animal cells and  can inhibit the formation of memories.

See also 
 Cycloheximide

References 

Acetate esters
Secondary alcohols
Antibiotics
Glutarimides
Ketones